Jatashankar (also Jata Shankar) is a natural cave and Hindu shrine located north of Pachmarhi, in Narmadapuram district, Madhya Pradesh, India. Jatashankar is located in a deep ravine with enormous boulders perched above. The cave contains stalagmites which are revered as naturally formed lingams. The cave serves as a shrine to the God Shiva and is a popular destination for pilgrims. Jata means hair and Shankar is another name of Lord Shiva. There are two ponds fed by springs found in the locality, one of cold water and the other one of hot water. The cave structure resembles to a hundred head snake named Sheshnag a mythological character.

Religious Importance 
The Jatashankar caves are considered as very sacred place as the caves are believed  to be the spot where Lord Shiva concealed himself from the wrath of Bhasmasur.

References 

Tourist attractions in Narmadapuram district
Hindu cave temples in India
Shiva temples in Madhya Pradesh
Caves of Madhya Pradesh
Pachmarhi